The European Society of Anaesthesiology and Intensive Care is a European professional association of anaesthetists and anaesthesiologists. It is also active in the fields of emergency, intensive care, pain and perioperative medicine

It was formed in 2005 as the European Society of Anaesthesiology through the merger of three previous organisations: the European Academy of Anaesthesiology, dating from 1978; the European Society of Anaesthesiologists, established in 1992; and the Confederation of European National Societies of Anaesthesiology. In 2020 the name was changed to European Society of Anaesthesiology and Intensive Care, reflecting the expansion of the activities of the organisation into intensive care medicine, particularly in the context of the COVID-19 pandemic.

The European Journal of Anaesthesiology, the academic journal of the society, was established in 1983; it is published by Wolters Kluwer, as is an open-access journal, the European Journal of Anaesthesiology and Intensive Care.

Notes and references 

Anesthesiology organizations
Organizations established in 2005
International medical associations of Europe